The 2019 London Summit of the North Atlantic Treaty Organization (NATO) was the 30th formal meeting of the heads of state and heads of government of the North Atlantic Treaty Organization. It was held in The Grove, Watford, Hertfordshire, England, United Kingdom, on 3 and 4 December 2019.

It also marked the 70th anniversary of the founding of NATO.

Leaders and other dignitaries in attendance

Member states

Non-member states and organisations

Controversies
U.S. President Donald Trump said French President Emmanuel Macron's November comment that NATO was in a state of "brain death" for its reaction to the 2019 Turkish offensive into north-eastern Syria was "very, very nasty." The two leaders disagreed about terrorism, trade, and France's contributions to NATO's budget. Trump mentioned the possibility of France "breaking off" from NATO, although Macron made no such suggestion.

Trump and British Prime Minister Boris Johnson did not meet because Johnson was concerned about Trump's possible interference with the 12 December UK general election.

While meeting with Canadian Prime Minister Justin Trudeau, Trump complained that Canada is "slightly delinquent" in its contribution to NATO because it pays less than 2% of its GDP on the military. The two leaders had a friendly discussion about the United States–Mexico–Canada Agreement. Later, during a reception at Buckingham Palace, Trudeau, Johnson, Macron, and Dutch Prime Minister Mark Rutte seemed to mock Trump because of a 45-minute press conference. In turn, Trump called Trudeau, "two-faced," referencing Canada's military spending.

Turkish President Recep Tayyip Erdoğan insisted that NATO members formally recognize the Kurdish YPG as a terrorist organization. Erdoğan and Greek Prime Minister Kyriakos Mitsotakis also met to discuss a contentious maritime agreement signed between Turkey and Libya for the definition of maritime zones in the Eastern Mediterranean.

Other 
Due to its political crisis, Spain was the last country left to approve North Macedonia's NATO membership; nonetheless, North Macedonia was given a seat at the summit alongside other members and represented by a delegation headed by Prime Minister Zoran Zaev.

On 26 November 2019, an earthquake struck Albania. At the NATO London summit, constructive discussions were held by Albanian Prime Minister Edi Rama with Macron, Trump, Trudeau, Johnson and other European leaders over establishing an international conference for financial aid.

References 

2019 conferences
2019 in British politics
2019 in England
2019 in international relations
2010s in Hertfordshire
21st-century diplomatic conferences (NATO)
December 2019 events in the United Kingdom
Diplomatic conferences in the United Kingdom
Events in England
History of Watford
NATO summits
United Kingdom and NATO